Richard Turner (25 September 1941, in Stellenbosch – 8 January 1978, in Durban), known as Rick Turner, was a South African academic and anti-apartheid activist who was murdered, possibly by the South African security forces, in 1978. Nelson Mandela described Turner "as a source of inspiration".

Life
Turner matriculated from St George's Grammar School, Cape Town in 1959 and graduated from the University of Cape Town in 1963, attaining a B.A. Honours. He continued his studies at the Sorbonne in Paris where he studied philosophy under Henri Lefebvre and received a doctorate for a dissertation on the French intellectual, Jean-Paul Sartre.

 He returned to South Africa in 1966 and worked on his mother's farm in Stellenbosch for two years before lecturing at the universities of Cape Town, Stellenbosch and Rhodes. He moved to Natal in 1970 and become a senior lecturer in political science at the University of Natal and in that same year he met Steve Biko and the two formed a close relationship and became the leading figures in The Durban Moment.

Turner became a prominent academic at the University and assumed a leading role in radical philosophy in South Africa and published a number of papers. His work was written from a radical existential perspective and stressed the virtues of bottom up popular democracy against authoritarian Stalinist and Trotskyist strands of leftism. He was a strong advocate of workers' control and a critic of the reduction of politics to party politics.

Works
In 1972 Turner wrote a book called The Eye of the Needle - Towards Participatory Democracy in South Africa.  The South African authorities thought that the book exercised a strong influence on opposition thinking with its plea for a radically democratic and non-racial South Africa. Such a society, he argued, would liberate whites as well as blacks.

In 1973 he published a widely influential article titled "Dialectical Reason", in the British journal Radical Philosophy. In the same year he was banned by the South African authorities for five years. He was not allowed to visit his two daughters or his mother and had to stay in the Durban area. Even though he was banned this did not stop him from speaking out and in April 1973 Turner and other banned individuals staged an Easter fast to illustrate the sufferings that bannings impose on people. The fast was supported by the Pope and the Archbishop of Canterbury. After his banning Turner was kept on the staff at the University of Natal even though he was not allowed to lecture.

Political activism
He attended the South African Student Organisation (SASO) terrorism trial of nine Black Consciousness movement leaders as a defence witness in March 1976 where he expounded on theories expressed in The Eye of the Needle. In November 1976 Dr Turner received a Humboldt Fellowship, one of the world's leading academic awards from Heidelberg University, but after months of negotiating with the Minister of Justice, he was refused permission to travel to Germany. Turner was also involved with the re-emerging black trade union movement of the 1970s, although the relationship was fraught at times.

Assassination 
On 8 January 1978, Turner was shot through a window of his home in Dalton Avenue, Bellair (a suburb of Durban), and died in the arms of his 13-year-old daughter, Jann. After months of police investigations, no significant clues were found and his killers were never identified. However it is widely believed that he was murdered by the security services.

Legacy
He is recognised as the one of the most significant academic philosophers to have come out of South Africa. His work is still read in popular radical movements and South African academics like Anthony Fluxman, Mabogo Percy More, Andrew Nash and Peter Vale have continued to make use of his work.

Family
Turner had two children, daughters Jann Turner and Kim Turner, and was married twice: first to Barbara Follett (née Hubbard) and then to Foszia Turner (née Fisher). Turner's eldest daughter Jann Turner is a director, novelist, television director and screenwriter. Barbara Follett later became a British Labour Party Member of Parliament.

Writing by Rick Turner
What is Political Philosophy?, Radical, 1968
The Eye of the Needle, 1972
Dialectical Reason, Radical Philosophy, No.4., 1973
The Relevance of Contemporary Radical Thought, SPRO-CAS, 1971

Articles or Books on Turner
Choosing to be Free : the life story of Rick Turner, by Billy Keniston, 2013. Auckland Park: Jacana
Rick Turner, SA History Online
Philosophy & the Crisis in South Africa, M.A. Nupen, 1988
Richard Turner and the Politics of Emancipation , Duncan Greeves, 1987
Biographical introduction in 'The eye of the needle' by Tony Morphet, 1980
Brushing Against the Grain: Oppositional Discourse in South Africa by Tony Morphet, 1990
The Moment of Western Marxism by Andrew Nash, 1999
Re-Reading Rick Turner in the New South Africa, by Tony Fluxman and Peter Vale, 2004
Black Consciousness in Dialogue: Steve Biko, Richard Turner and the ‘Durban Moment’ in South Africa, 1970 – 1974, Ian McQueen, SOAS, 2009
Hippies, radicals and the Sounds of Silence - Cultural Dialectics at two South African Universities 1966-1976 , Helen Lunn, PhD Thesis, UKZN, 2010
Eddie Webster, the Durban moment and new labour internationalism, Rob Lambert, 2010
Re-imagining South Africa: Black Consciousness, radical Christianity and the New Left, 1967 – 1977, Ian McQueen, PhD Thesis, University of Sussex, 2011
My personal reflections about writing The Eye of the Needle , Foszia Turner-Stylianou, Daily Maverick, 2022

See also
 The Durban Moment
 List of people subject to banning orders under apartheid
 List of unsolved murders

References

External links
Link to Television Documentary on Turner
Rick Turner Website - includes biography, some of Turners' writings, some commentary on his work and reflection on his assassination, 'SA History OnlineRick Turner Website, University of KwaZulu-Natal''

1942 births
1978 deaths
20th-century South African philosophers
Assassinated South African activists
Deaths by firearm in South Africa
Existentialists
Left communists
Male murder victims
Marxist humanists
Marxist theorists
People from Stellenbosch
People murdered in South Africa
South African democracy activists
South African humanists
South African murder victims
South African people of British descent
South African trade unionists
University of Cape Town alumni
University of Paris alumni
Unsolved murders in South Africa
White South African anti-apartheid activists
Academic staff of the University of Natal